Rick Terry Schmeig is an American football center who is currently a free agent. He played college football for the Purdue University. He went undrafted during the 2013 NFL Draft, and signed as an undrafted free agent with the Indianapolis Colts.

Early years
Schmeig attended Oak Hills High School in Cincinnati, Ohio, and played for the Oak Hills Highlanders football team.

College career
Schmeig enrolled in the Purdue University, where he played for the Purdue Boilermakers football team from 2009 to 2012.

Professional career
After going undrafted during the 2013 NFL Draft, Schmeig signed with the Indianapolis Colts as an undrafted free agent. On August 25, 2013, he was waived by the Colts.

On February 25, 2016, Schmeig signed with the Northern Kentucky Nightmare of American Indoor Football.

References

External links
Purdue Boilermakers bio

Living people
American football centers
Purdue Boilermakers football players
Indianapolis Colts players
1990 births
Northern Kentucky Nightmare players
Players of American football from Cincinnati